Diminići is a small settlement in the Labinština peninsula in Istria County, Croatia. This settlement is grouped with Kobavići and is known as Sveti Lovreč Labinski /San Lorenzo di Albona/ Sveti Lovreč Labinski. This settlement belongs to the Raša Municipality, Croatia. It is located just south of Sveti Lovreč Labinski.

See also 

Sveti Lovreč Labinski
Kobavići
Labinština

References 

Populated places in Istria County